Monumento a la Independencia may refer to:

 Angel of Independence, Mexico City, Mexico
 Monumento a la Independencia (Guadalajara), Jalisco, Mexico